Altıntaş (or ܟܦܪܙܐ) is a village in the Midyat District of Mardin Province in southeastern Turkey. It is part of the municipality Midyat. The village is inhabited by Kurds of the Dermemikan tribe and by Assyrians who belong to the Syriac Orthodox Church and speak Turoyo, a dialect of Neo-Aramaic.

In the village, there are churches of Yoldath Aloho, Mor Yohannon, Mor Abrohom, and Mor Izozoel. There is also the ruins of the churches of Mor Eliyo and Mor Malke. The monastery of Mor Moses was located nearby the village, which was constructed by 1085 AD.

The village had a population of 214 in 2021.

Etymology
The Turkish name of the village comprises two words, "altın" ("gold" in Turkish) and "taş" ("stone" in Turkish), therefore Altıntaş translates to "gold stone". The Syriac name of the village is derived from "kfar" ("village" in Syriac).

History
It was attested that Emperor Anastasius I Dicorus had constructed a church at Kfarze, however, the historian Andrew Palmer argues this was fabricated to add historicity. The church of Mor Izozoel at Kfarze was likely constructed in the late 7th century AD. The village is first mentioned in 935 AD (AG 1246), as attested by an inscription to commemorate the construction of the outdoor oratory at the church of Mor Izozoel. The church of Mor Izozoel was looted by Kurds in 1416, and led to the loss of an icon of the church's patron saint. 

The Kurdish rebel Izz al-Din Scher, a relative of Emir Bedir Khan Beg of Bohtan, attacked Kfarze in 1855, which resulted in severe damage to the church of Mor Izozoel and the death of many of the village's inhabitants, including four priests. The village was visited by the British archaeologist Gertrude Bell in 1909 and 1911. During the Assyrian genocide, upon receiving news of an impending Kurdish attack, most of the village's Assyrian population fled to Inwardo whilst those who remained were killed. The survivors later returned to Kfarze in 1922. Part of the nave vault of the church of Mor Izozoel collapsed during the First World War or immediately after, and was restored in 1936. A significant number of the village's Assyrian population emigrated abroad to Germany, Belgium, and France in the late 20th century.

Demography
The following is a list of the number of Assyrian families that have inhabited Kfarze per year stated. Unless otherwise stated, all figures are from the list provided in Eastern Christianity, Theological Reflection on Religion, Culture, and Politics in the Holy Land and Christian Encounter with Islam and the Muslim World, as noted in the bibliography below.

1914: 
1966: 130
1978: 68
1979: 64
1981: 42
1987: 27
1995: 12
1997: 12
2005: 12
2013: 11–12

The following is a list of Kurdish families that have inhabited Kfarze per year stated:

1914: 70
2005: 35–40
2013: 23

Notable people

Saint Severus of Kfarze, abbot of Qartmin.
Dionysius David, Syriac Orthodox archbishop of Qartmin and Beth Risha.
Basil Behnam, Syriac Orthodox maphrian of Tur Abdin.
Yuhanna Awgen, Syriac Orthodox archbishop of Qartmin.
Julius Simon, Syriac Orthodox archbishop of the Monastery of the Cross.
Cyril Zaytun Sawar, Syriac Orthodox archbishop of the Monastery of the Cross.
Dionysius Isa Gürbüz, Syriac Orthodox Patriarchal Vicar of Switzerland & Austria (b. 1964)

References
Notes

Citations

Bibliography

Assyrian communities in Turkey
Tur Abdin
Villages in Midyat District
Places of the Assyrian genocide
Kurdish settlements in Mardin Province